Islamic miniatures are small paintings on paper, usually book or manuscript illustrations but also sometimes separate artworks. The earliest examples date from around 1000 AD, with a flourishing of the artform from around 1200 AD. The field is divided by scholars into four types, Arabic, Mughal (Indian), Ottoman (Turkish), and Persian.

See also 

 Arabic miniature
 Ottoman miniature
 Persian miniature
 Mughal miniature

References

 
Miniature painting
Islamic arts of the book